Tipu Munshi (born 25 August 1950) is a Bangladeshi politician who has served as the Awami League Member of Parliament for Rangpur-4 since January 2009. In January 2019, he was appointed the Minister of Commerce.

Early life
Munshi was born on 25 August 1950 in Gopalganj District, Bangladesh. His family later moved to Rangpur District. He has a bachelor's degree from Government Titumir College .

Career
Munshi was elected to Parliament from Rangpur-4 on 5 January 2014 as a Bangladesh Awami League candidate. He is the managing director of Sepal Group. He is the chair of the Parliamentary Standing Committee on Ministry of Home Affairs. He is a former president of the Bangladesh Garment Manufacturers and Exporters Association. He is a director of STS group, the holding company of Apollo Hospital Dhaka.

In September 2022, during a conference hosted by the National Garment Workers Federation, Munshi supported demands to raise the pay of garment factory workers, stating that they had toiled to make the country prosperous and deserved better wages in light of rising inflation caused by the Russia-Ukraine conflict.

References

Living people
1950 births
Awami League politicians
9th Jatiya Sangsad members
10th Jatiya Sangsad members
11th Jatiya Sangsad members
Commerce ministers of Bangladesh
Government Titumir College alumni
People from Gopalganj District, Bangladesh